André Marcel Berthelot (20 May 1862 – 6 June 1938) was the son of the chemist and politician Marcellin Berthelot and Sophie Berthelot and a député of the Seine.

He was secretary-general of the Grande Encyclopédie starting with the fourth volume. He was also a banker, a professor in ancient history, a vice-president of the École des hautes études, and a member of the École de Rome. He was the founding chairman of the Banque Industrielle de Chine and led its board until the bank's failure in 1921.

References

External links 
  Notice biographique sur www.senat.fr 
  Notice biographique sur www.assemblee-nationale.fr 

1862 births
1938 deaths
Politicians from Paris
Lycée Henri-IV alumni
Academic staff of the École pratique des hautes études
Senators of Seine (department)